Amadou Séré (born 30 December 1987 in Ouagadougou) is a Burkinabé football (soccer) goalkeeper with Etoile Filante Ouagadougou of the Burkinabé Premier League.

Career
Séré began his career on 16 April 2006 with Etoile Filante Ouagadougou and was one year later in summer 2007 promoted to first team who plays in the Burkinabé Premier League.

International
Séré capped with the Burkina Faso national football team and presented his homeland at 2007 UEMOA Tournament. He was also member for Burkina Faso at 2007 African Youth Championship in Congo.

References

1987 births
Living people
Burkinabé footballers
Burkina Faso international footballers
Association football goalkeepers
Étoile Filante de Ouagadougou players
Sportspeople from Ouagadougou
21st-century Burkinabé people